Astro Vellithirai HD is a 24-hour Tanglish movie channel and also known as the Tamil version of the Asian HBO, showing the local and Kollywood movies. The channel began its broadcast on 16 April 2007 on channel 74, and moved to channel 202 on 1 October of the same year due to channel renumbering. Most of the movies are available in English subtitles.

The channel is available for all Astro and NJOI customers.

Logos

References

Astro Malaysia Holdings television channels
Television channels and stations established in 2007
Tamil-language television channels
Vellithirai